Arthur Sprenger (31 August 1889 – 20 July 1966) was a South African cricketer. He played in eleven first-class matches for Border from 1908/09 to 1923/24.

See also
 List of Border representative cricketers

References

External links
 

1889 births
1966 deaths
South African cricketers
Border cricketers
Sportspeople from Qonce